Sand Creek is a tributary of the San Diego River in San Diego County, California.

References

Rivers of San Diego County, California
San Diego River
Rivers of Southern California